Lawrence County Academy was a private, co-educational PK–12 school in Lawrence County, Mississippi, near Monticello. The school has been described as a segregation academy.

History
In January 1970, the United States Court of Appeals for the Fifth Circuit ordered Mississippi to desegregate its public schools. Lawrence County Academy was founded in 1970 as a segregation academy. The school's team nickname was Rebels.

The school closed in September, 1986 due to declining enrollment.

In 2018 Mississippi Senate special election, Cindy Hyde-Smith was criticized for attendance at the school.

Notable people
Cindy Hyde-Smith, U.S. Senator
Ronnie Shows, U.S. Representative

See also

List of private schools in Mississippi

References

Private elementary schools in Mississippi
Private middle schools in Mississippi
Private high schools in Mississippi
Schools in Lawrence County, Mississippi
Segregation academies in Mississippi
Educational institutions established in 1970